Ilheringia is a peer-reviewed scientific journal composed of two series dealing with zoology and botany: Série Zoologia and Série Botânica.

External links
 , Série Zoologia
 , Série Botânica

Zoology journals
Botany journals
Publications established in 1958
Multilingual journals
Open access journals
Academic journals published by museums
Academic journals published by non-profit organizations of Brazil
Hijacked journals